Berasia Assembly constituency is one of the 230 constituencies in the Madhya Pradesh Legislative Assembly of Madhya Pradesh, a central state of India. Berasia is also part of the Bhopal Lok Sabha constituency. It is a reserved seat for the Scheduled Caste (SC).

Members of Legislative Assembly

As part of Bhopal State
 1952 : Shankar Dayal Sharma, Indian National Congress

As part of Madhya Pradesh 
 1957: (2-seat constituency) Hari Krishna Singh and Bhagwan Singh, Indian National Congress
 1962: Bhaiya Lal, Akhil Bharatiya Hindu Mahasabha
 1967: Laxminarayan Sharma, Bharatiya Jana Sangh
 1972: Gauri Shankar Kaushal, Bharatiya Jana Sangh
 1977: Gauri Shanker Koushal, Janata Party
 1980: Laxminarayan Sharma, Bharatiya Janata Party
 1985: Laxminarayan Sharma, Bharatiya Janata Party
 1990: Laxminarayan Sharma, Bharatiya Janata Party
 1993: Laxminarayan Sharma, Bharatiya Janata Party
 1998: Jodharam Gurjar, Indian National Congress
 2003: Bhaktpal Singh, Bharatiya Janata Party
 2008: Brahmanand Ratnakar, Bharatiya Janata Party
 2013: Vishnu Khatri, Bharatiya Janata Party

See also
 Berasia
 List of constituencies of Madhya Pradesh Legislative Assembly
 Bhopal

References

Assembly constituencies of Madhya Pradesh
Bhopal
Bhopal district
1957 establishments in Madhya Pradesh
Constituencies established in 1957